Highway 25 is a rural highway in southern Israel. It begins northwest of Nahal Oz at the border with the Gaza Strip, and it passes through Netivot, Beersheba and Dimona. It continues southeast toward Arava Junction, where it meets Highway 90. Its length is estimated by the Israeli Department of Transportation as 172 km and 780 meters.

Junctions & Interchanges

Hazardous road

Highway 25 was declared as a red road by the Israeli police in 2015.

See also
 List of highways in Israel

References

25